The Otoko-machi Map (男街マップ, "men's city map") is a country-wide guide to Japanese gay establishments.

Published yearly, the guide, which is organized by prefecture and city, contains listings for bars, clubs, and host-bars, gay saunas, gay restaurants and bookstores, and other gay or gay-friendly establishments.

Listings for bars typically include a photograph of the owner or bartenders, as well as information on the type of customers preferred.

Most listings are accompanied by maps giving directions from the nearest train station.

References

 Japan in the Footsteps of Yukio Mishima, Out Traveler, January/February 2005 

Annual magazines
LGBT-related magazines published in Japan
Sexuality in Japan
Magazines with year of establishment missing